Bryotropha palliptera is a moth of the family Gelechiidae. It is found in Henan, China.

References

Moths described in 2000
palliptera
Moths of Asia